The Duncan Trussell Family Hour (DTFH) is a free podcast hosted by American comedian, writer and actor Duncan Trussell.  As of May, 2022, there have been over 500 episodes.

History 
The Duncan Trussell Family Hour evolved out of the Lavender Hour, a previous podcast hosted by Duncan and his then-girlfriend Natasha Leggero.

Clips from the show were used in the Netflix original animated series, The Midnight Gospel, a collaboration between Trussell and Pendleton Ward.

See also 

 Religion and spirituality podcast

References

Comedy and humor podcasts
Religion and spirituality podcasts
2012 podcast debuts
Podcasts adapted into television shows